The 1951 UMass Redmen football team represented the University of Massachusetts Amherst in the 1951 college football season as a member of the Yankee Conference. The team was coached by Thomas Eck and played its home games at Alumni Field in Amherst, Massachusetts. The 1951 season was Eck's last as coach of the Minutemen. UMass finished the season with a record of 3–4–1 overall and 2–0 in conference play.

Schedule

References

UMass
UMass Minutemen football seasons
UMass Redmen football